Midsommarkransen (The Midsummer Wreath) is a suburban district of Stockholm with a history from 1775.

The underground metro station opened in 1964.

Districts of Stockholm